Apukohai is a marine monster in the mythology of the island of Kauai, Hawaii. Kawelo, a giant of enormous strength, departs for Oahu and encounters Apukohai. After a fierce struggle, Kawelo kills Apukohai, having invoked the assistance of the owl god and the fish Ulu-makaikai (Beckwith 1970: 409–411).

See also
Sherman's Lagoon

References
M. Beckwith, Hawaiian Mythology (University of Hawaii Press: Honolulu, 1970).

Hawaiian legendary creatures
Kauai